Distraction is the process of diverting the attention of an individual or group from a desired area of focus. 

Distraction may also refer to:

Media
 Distraction (game show), a game show that aired on Channel 4 in the United Kingdom
 Distraction (album), a 2014 album by Bear Hands
 "Distraction" (Kehlani song), 2016
 "Distraction" (Polo G song), 2022
 "Distraction", a song by Angels & Airwaves from the album We Don't Need to Whisper
 "Distraction" (novel), a 1998 book by Bruce Sterling

Medicine
 Distraction osteogenesis, a method in orthopedic surgery
 Distraction injury of the vertebral column

See also 
 Distractions (disambiguation)